The 2016 International Hockey Open was a women's field hockey tournament held at the Marrara Hockey Centre. It took place between 31 May – 4 June 2016 in Darwin, Australia. A total of four teams competed for the title.

New Zealand won the tournament by defeating Australia 2–0 in the final. Japan won the bronze medal by defeating India 2–1 in the third and fourth playoff.

Participating nations
A total of four teams competed for the title:

Results

Pool matches

Classification matches

Third and fourth place

Final

Statistics

Final standings

Goalscorers
2 Goals

 Emily Smith
 Motomi Kawamura
 Pippa Hayward
 Olivia Merry
 Kelsey Smith
 Petrea Webster

1 Goal

 Jodie Kenny
 Georgina Morgan
 Georgia Nanscawen
 Grace Stewart
 Kellie White
 Vandana Katariya
 Lilima Minz
 Poonam Rani
 Anuradha Thokchom
 Hazuki Nagai
 Maki Sakaguchi
 Minami Shimizu
 Anita McLaren

See also
Hockey Australia
International Hockey Federation

References

2016 in women's field hockey
Sport in Darwin, Northern Territory
2010s in the Northern Territory